Frederick Taylor (24 February 1920 – 1983) was an English professional association footballer who played as a winger. He played more than 100 matches in the Football League for Burnley and New Brighton before being forced to retire through injury in 1950.

References

1920 births
1983 deaths
Footballers from Burnley
English footballers
Association football wingers
Burnley F.C. players
New Brighton A.F.C. players
English Football League players